Torbjørn Steen Kristoffersen (4 May 1892 – 14 April 1986) was a Norwegian gymnast who competed in the 1920 Summer Olympics. He was part of the Norwegian team, which won the gold medal in the gymnastics men's team, free system event.

References

1892 births
1986 deaths
Norwegian male artistic gymnasts
Gymnasts at the 1920 Summer Olympics
Olympic gymnasts of Norway
Olympic silver medalists for Norway
Olympic medalists in gymnastics
Medalists at the 1920 Summer Olympics
20th-century Norwegian people